Mun Eun-jin (also transliterated Moon Eun-jin; born 24 December 1967) is a South Korean equestrian. She competed at the 1988 Summer Olympics and the 1992 Summer Olympics.

References

External links
 

1967 births
Living people
South Korean female equestrians
Olympic equestrians of South Korea
Equestrians at the 1988 Summer Olympics
Equestrians at the 1992 Summer Olympics
Asian Games medalists in equestrian
Asian Games bronze medalists for South Korea
Equestrians at the 1986 Asian Games
Medalists at the 1986 Asian Games
Place of birth missing (living people)